Mitotichthys is a genus of pipefishes native to the waters around Australia, with these currently recognized species:
 Mitotichthys meraculus (Whitley, 1948) (western crested pipefish)
 Mitotichthys mollisoni (E. O. G. Scott, 1955) (Mollison's pipefish)
 Mitotichthys semistriatus (Kaup, 1856) (half-banded pipefish)
 Mitotichthys tuckeri (E. O. G. Scott, 1942) (Tucker's pipefish)

References

Syngnathidae
Marine fish genera
Taxa named by Gilbert Percy Whitley